The Volvo C70 is a two-door, four-passenger sport compact manufactured and marketed by Volvo Cars from 1996 to 2013 across two generations.

The first generation (1996–2005) was available as both a coupé (1996–2002) and softtop convertible (1997–2005). The second generation (2006–2013) was available as a retractable hardtop convertible.



First generation (1996–2005)

Volvo debuted the first generation C70 at the 1996 Paris Motor Show, and introduced it in Europe as a 1997 model, and a year later as a 1998 model in North America — with 2.0 (sold mostly in Italy), a low-pressure turbo (2.4L) and a high-pressure turbo (2.0L and 2.3L), 5-cylinder, turbocharged petrol engines and manual and automatic transmissions. Ian Callum designed the exterior and Mexican designer Jose Diaz de la Vega led the interior design team.

The C70 broke Volvo's decades-long styling tradition of boxy, rectilinear designs and was Volvo's first luxury coupe since the 780. According to Peter Horbury, Volvo's design chief from 1991 to 2002, with the C70, Volvo threw away the box, but "kept the toy inside!" "Our vision was to design a convertible that would meet the needs of a family of four looking for comfortable blue-sky motoring in a vehicle also providing stylish looks, performance and faultless driving and road-holding."

In a development program of 30 months and working with a Volvo 850-derived platform, Britain’s TWR (Tom Walkinshaw Racing) co-designed the car's basic design and suspension tuning with Volvo. Manufacture of the C70 was a joint venture until the two companies experienced disputes that threatened to interrupt production; TWR did not contribute to the second generation C70.

Volvo's first modern convertible, the C70 was manufactured in Uddevalla, Sweden on a separate assembly line from the 70-series sedan and station wagon. The four-seater convertible featured an electrically heated glass rear window, automatic (pop-up) rollover hoops system ROPS, seat belt pre-tensioners, boron steel reinforced A-pillars, front and side airbags, and a safety cage — a horseshoe-like structure around the passenger compartment.

The cloth convertible top, initially available in four colors, was fully automatic, operated by a single, dashboard-mounted button. The top stored automatically under an integral rigid tonneau cover in a system pioneered in modern convertibles with the fourth generation Mercedes SL.

The C70 convertible exhibited two negative traits endemic to convertibles: poor rear visibility and pronounced scuttle shake, a characteristic whereby the structural design of the bulkhead between engine and passenger compartment of a convertible suffers sufficiently poor rigidity to negatively impact ride and handling, allowing noticeable vibration, shudder or chassis-flexing into the passenger compartment.

Early special editions featured two-tone leather interior with wood trim and a SC-901 (1998) Dolby Pro Logic I stereo with 3-disc integrated changer unit (via a cartridge) 400 watts of power and 11 high end Dynaudio speakers.

First generation models

C70 coupé

C70 cabriolet

C70
The C70, was introduced to the press in a signature color (saffron pearl metallic) and for the debut marketing, the 1997 film The Saint featured a C70 — recalling the notable connection of the Volvo P1800 and the television series from the early 1960s, The Saint with Roger Moore as Simon Templar. The total number of cars produced with the signature saffron pearl metallic paint was reportedly 145.
There was no 2005 model C70 in North America, the 2004 left over models were sold into 2005 there.
72,000 first generation C70s were produced in the seven years up to 2006, fewer than 50,000 were convertibles.

Volvo cosmetically updated the convertible with new clear headlights and rear light clusters for model year 2004.

C70 Collection special edition 
Introduced in February 2004, the C70 Collection package featured Titanium Grey Pearl exterior with Toscana Tan exclusive soft leather. It included special deco stitching in the seats, armrests, sun visors and door panels, together with aluminium inserts in the centre stack and other interior fittings. It was also available in Black Sapphire, Titanium Grey Pearl or Silver metallic exterior combined with Off Black exclusive soft leather with contrast deco stitching. In this form it had Carbon-fibre inserts in the centre stack and other interior fittings. Both packages included an exclusive polished 17-inch wheel design, and luxury floor mats. The exclusive leather also extended to the door panels.

Relative sales performance 

Of the 72,000 first generation C70s produced worldwide, 26,036 were Coupés and 46,786 were Convertibles. Volvo Cars of North America reported that 24,948 Convertibles were sold in the US, plus 6,465 Coupés. Of those US-market Coupés, 603 had the 2.3 Liter engine with high pressure turbo (T5) and the M56 5-speed manual transmission. It's believed only 135 of the C70 T5M coupés painted "Saffron" made it to the US market.

Engines

Second generation (2006–2013)

The second generation C70 model debuted at the 2005 Frankfurt Motor Show, sharing the Volvo S40 platform, designed by John Kinsey and built by Pininfarina Sverige AB — a joint venture between Pininfarina and Volvo (and the first time Pininfarina has manufactured outside Italy). The C70 retractable hardtop replaces its predecessors two models: both the convertible and the coupé, the latter which had been absent from Volvo's lineup since 2003. The retractable hardtop went on sale in the U.S. in spring 2006.

The Insurance Institute for Highway Safety in the United States conducted its first crash tests of several convertibles, designating the C70 a "Top Safety Pick".

Top mechanism 
The three-section hardtop assembly, manufactured by Pininfarina in Uddevalla by its subsidiary RHTU Sverige A.B. and developed with Webasto, raises or lowers in under 30 seconds and includes a global window switch that allows simultaneous raising or lowering of all windows, and a button to power-activate the raising of the folded top stack within the trunk — specifically to increase access to cargo storage when the top is lowered.

Operation of the retractable hard top is possible only when the car is stationary and requires no extra space behind the car while the roof is being raised or lowered but requires a height clearance of six feet seven inches (2,006.6 mm) — and requires the driver to hold the console button for the full operation. The top features a fabric headliner that unfurls and is tensioned by wires as the roof moves into place, as well as mesh wind blocker that clips over the rear seats when driving with two front passengers. The blocker has zippered openings for parcel storage and folds in half for trunk stowage.

The trunk lid, which opens both in a rear-hinged mode to stow the folding roof as well as standard a front-hinged mode for luggage loading, is aluminum — while the three roof sections are steel. A trunk divider enables assessment of precisely how much can be loaded with the roof down. Trunk space is 13 cubic feet with the top raised (368.12 L) and seven cubic feet (198.22 L) with the top lowered.

A hatch in the backrest of the rear seat enables transport of long objects inside the car, e.g., skis. Overall body rigidity is improved by approximately 15 percent when the roof is raised.

Safety 
Safety systems include a door-mounted side impact protection inflatable which inflates upward when activated. The curtain has an extra stiff construction with double rows of slats that are slightly offset from each other. This allows them to remain upright and offer effective head protection even with the window open. The curtain also deflates slowly to provide protection should the car roll over. This is a unique solution in the automotive world.

The C70 retractable hardtop also features a roll over protection structure (ROPS) with two pyrotechnically charged roll hoops hidden behind the rear seats that deploy under roll-over conditions whether the roof is retracted or not. Volvo featured this advancement in a copy of the "Volvo Saved My Life Club" brochures. There, a woman was able to walk away from an accident after she slid off an ice-covered mountain road and rolled her C70 which then slid more than  down the mountain face.

Production 
As of 2006, production was increased from 16,000 annual units to 20,000. 
A total of 88,760 Volvo C70 II were sold between 2006 and 2015. The last Volvo C70 rolled off the production line on the 25th of June 2013.

2010 update

Volvo introduced an updated version of the C70, in Flamenco Red Pearl paint, at the 2009 Frankfurt Motor Show, and later at the 2010 South Florida International Auto Show. Revisions included a redesigned front end and new rear LED lamps.

The engine and transmission remain the same as before, and the interior is largely unchanged. It went on sale in early 2010.

US model went on sale in 2010 as 2011 model year vehicle. Early model includes C70 T5.

C70 Inscription (2011–2013)
The C70 Inscription is a limited (2,000 units a year) version of the C70 with choice of three colours (Black Stone (Solid), Black Sapphire (Metallic) and Ice White (Solid)), 18-inch Midir wheels in black with polished spokes and outer perimeter, high-gloss paint on the grille and the LED Daytime Running Lights surrounded by contrasting chrome, an exclusive leather-covered dashboard with contrasting stitching, Sovereign Hide upholstery in Off Black or Calcite with the same contrasting stitching as on dashboard, handbrake lever and carpets; "Inscription" embroidered on the front headrests, special Inscription carpets and handbrake lever, steering wheel and gear shift knob with aluminium inlays, sports pedals with aluminium inlay, aluminium inlay in centre stack (optional Black or Nordic Light Oak)

The vehicle was unveiled at the 2011 Los Angeles Auto Show, and went on sale beginning in November 2011.

North American model went on sale in the first quarter of 2012 in limited quantities (500 units in 2012), and includes T5 engine, Active dual Xenon headlights, rear spoilers, aluminium sport pedals.

2013 Volvo Special Edition C70 (2013)
The Volvo Special Edition C70 is a version of the 2013 Volvo C70 for the Canadian market with BLIS (Blindspot Information System), 18-inch Midir diamond-cut alloy rims, retractable side view mirrors, an integrated wind blocker, choice of 3 body colours (Ice White, Electric Silver, Ember Black), bespoke interiors swathed in Graphite Sovereign Hide, Cacao Sovereign Hide and Cranberry Leather; free option spare wheel kit containing a spare wheel Tempa Spare in trunk.

Engines

Production
Production of the C70 began in Volvo's joint-venture plant with Pininfarina Sverige in Uddevalla, Sweden in 2005. On 4 October 2011 it was announced that production would cease in 2013, following the termination of the joint venture. The last C70 rolled out of the Uddevalla assembly plant on 25 June 2013.

See also
Volvo S40
Volvo C30
Roll over protection structure

References

External links

C70
Coupés
Convertibles
Hardtop convertibles
Front-wheel-drive vehicles
Ford C1 platform
Cars introduced in 1997
Cars introduced in 2006
2010s cars
Pininfarina vehicles